May City is an unincorporated community in Osceola County, Iowa, United States.

Demographics
The population of May City was 43, according to the 2000 census.

History
The town was created in 1889. May City's population was 27 in 1902, and was 35 in 1925.

The town has a Lutheran church, St. John's. There is also a fire department in the town that is named "The May City Fire Department". The 125th Anniversary of the town was on July 19, 2014.

Education
May City is served by the Hartley–Melvin–Sanborn Community School District.

References

Unincorporated communities in Osceola County, Iowa
Unincorporated communities in Iowa
Populated places established in 1889